Broadway Theatre was a theatre in downtown Portland, Oregon, operating from 1926 until the 1980s. The building was demolished in 1988 and replaced with the 1000 Broadway building.

References

External links
 

1926 establishments in Oregon
1988 disestablishments in Oregon
Buildings and structures demolished in 1988
Demolished buildings and structures in Portland, Oregon
Demolished theatres in Oregon
Southwest Portland, Oregon
Theatres completed in 1926
Theatres in Portland, Oregon